The Nigerien Progressive Party – African Democratic Rally (PPN-RDA) is a political party in Niger.  It was the leading political party of the pre-independence era, becoming the sole legal party of the First Republic (1960–1974). It was led by Niger's first President, Hamani Diori. After the end of military rule, the party reappeared as a minor parliamentary party led by Diori's son, Abdoulaye Hamani Diori.

History

Pre-independence
As the name indicates, the PPN confederated in 1946 with a grouping of regional of pro-independence parties within French West Africa and French Equatorial Africa to form the Rassemblement Démocratique Africain (African Democratic Rally—RDA ).  Under the leadership of Hamani Diori, the PPN paired appeals to traditional society within the Colony of Niger while its representatives worked with the French Communist Party in France, which was the only force supporting independence for France's colonial possessions.

In 1946 the single pro-Independence party in Niger was the Nigerien Progressive Party (PPN), of which Hamani Diori and Djibo Bakary were the most prominent members, and which numbered only 5000 members. Simultaneously, these colonial territories were allowed limited representation in the French National Assembly, with Niger allotted one seat in 1946 and a second in 1948. PPN Party leader Hamani Diori filled the first, and a French educated Niamey lawyer, Djibo Bakary, filled the second. Bakary, a leftist, helped push the party—already perceived as anti-French—in a populist direction.  The PPN was allied to the pan-colony African Democratic Rally (RDA), which itself caucused with the French Communist Party in the National Assembly. Some elements, such as RDA leader Félix Houphouët-Boigny, were uncomfortable with this connection. Many in the PPN felt the same way, while many other, grouped around Bakary and the tiny Nigerien Trades Union movement, pulled to the left. Earlier splits of the PPN, of conservative Djerma traditional leaders and a small Franco-Nigerien contingent in 1946, were added to 1948 in reaction to Bakary and his circle and to the continued association with the RDA.  Harou Kouka and Georges Condat split to form a group ("Parti Independent du Niger-Est PINE") that quickly joined with previous dissidents to create the Union of Nigerien Independents and Sympathisers (UNIS).  This relatively conservative coalition benefited from French support, and gained control of the consultative institutions of the Niger colony from 1948-1952. Diori, much like RDA chair Félix Houphouët-Boigny, broke from the PCF in 1951 and by 1958 was close to the colonial authorities in Niamey. This faction retained both the PPN name and the connection with the RDA, while Djibo Bakary now broke from the RDA to retain ties with the French Communist Party.  Bakary's new party, Sawaba, prospered in the 1957 Territorial Assembly elections to the detriment of the PPN. In the 1958 constitutional referendum and Assembly elections, the PPN supported continued association with France under the French Community, while its primary rival, called for immediate independence from France. The PPN swept the Assembly elections, with Diori becoming its chair (essentially, Prime Minister to the colonial governor's presidential role). Sawaba was suppressed and outlawed prior to independence in 1960 with the help of French officials.

Post-independence

Single party era
The PPN-RDA was the country's sole legal party from 1960 until 1974, when the regime of President Hamani Diori was overthrown in a military coup.  As president of the PPN, Diori was the only candidate for president of the republic, and was re-elected unopposed for five-year terms in 1965 and 1970.  In those same years, a single list of PPN-RDA candidates was returned to the National Assembly.

During this period public criticism of the leadership was forbidden, Assembly sessions were largely ceremonial, and practical governance was carried out by the Political Bureau of the PPN, headed by Diori, Boubou Hama, and a small cadre of supporters. The PPN was reviled by many as tied to traditional elites (especially from the west of the country), too close a partner with French interests, and financially corrupt.  The famine which struck the region following the 1969-73 drought, scandals surrounding lack of food aid, along with personal discontent amongst the military, led to the April 1974 coup which ended the PPN's role in Nigerien politics.

Democratic era
The PPN-RDA was resurrected in 1991, following the return to democracy, under the leadership of Diori's eldest son Abdoulaye Hamani Diori. It won two seats in the 1993 parliamentary elections, and nominated Oumarou Garba Issoufou for the subsequent presidential elections; he finished sixth out of eight candidates with 2% of the vote. The party was reduced to one seat in the 1995 parliamentary elections, and lost parliamentary representation after it boycotted the 1996 elections. When it ran in the 1999 elections it failed to win a seat.

It contested the 2004 general elections in an alliance with the Nigerien Party for Democracy and Socialism (PNDS) and Nigerien Self-Management Party (PNA). The joint list won four seats, and Abdoulaye Hamani Diori led its parliamentary delegation from 2004 until 2009.

The party opposed Mamadou Tandja's constitutional referendum of 2009 and was a member of the opposition FDD (Front for Defense of Democracy) and CFDR (Coordination of Forces for Democracy and the Republic) party coalitions during the 2009–10 Nigerien constitutional crisis. It endorsed Mahamadou Issoufou of the PNDS for the presidency in the 2011 general elections, but won no seats in the new National Assembly. It also failed to win a seat in the 2016 general elections

Electoral history

Presidential Elections

National Assembly elections

See also 
 Parmehutu
 Edouard Karemera

References

Political parties in Niger
Parties of one-party systems
Sections of the Rassemblement Démocratique Africain
1946 establishments in Niger
Political parties established in 1946
Pan-Africanist political parties in Africa